Margaret Santiago (1931 – March 17, 2018) was an American museum registrar. Santiago, who worked at the National Museum of Natural History, was the first African-American to work as a registrar for a major scientific museum, and a co-founder of the African American Museums Association (later the Association of African American Museums).

Career 
Santiago began working at the Smithsonian in 1960 as a clerk typist. She was promoted to assistant supervisor in accessions and specimen control at the National Museum of Natural History in 1963. By 1970, she was the supervisor of that unit. In 1977, Santiago became the first African-American to work as a registrar for any major scientific museum, a position she held until her retirement. 

Santiago was a co-founder of the African American Museums Association (later the Association of African American Museums). Santiago retired from the Smithsonian in 1991, after a thirty year career.

Personal life 
Santiago was born in Spartanburg, South Carolina in 1931. As a young woman, she sang at Macedonia Baptist Church in Spartanburg, and on a radio program in Washington, D.C. In 1987, she released an album titled, "MarGueritte S. Soulful Gospel." (She was called MarGeuritte by friends.)

Santiago was married and had at least three children.

She also lived in Puerto Rico and Atlanta, GA.

Santiago died on March 17, 2018.

References

External links 
Margaret Santiago Photograph and Postcard Collection

1931 births
2018 deaths
People from Spartanburg, South Carolina
Museum people
Smithsonian Institution people
African-American people